In quantum field theory, a non-topological soliton (NTS) is a soliton field configuration possessing, contrary to a topological one, a conserved Noether charge and stable against transformation into usual particles of this field for the following reason. For fixed charge Q, the mass sum of Q free particles exceeds the energy (mass) of the NTS so that the latter is energetically favorable to exist.

The interior region of an  NTS is occupied by vacuum different from the ambient vacuum. The vacuums are separated by the surface of the NTS representing a domain wall configuration (topological defect), which also appears in field theories with broken discrete symmetry. Infinite domain walls contradict cosmology, but the surface of an NTS is closed and finite, so its existence would not be contradictory. If the topological domain wall is closed, it shrinks because of wall tension; however, due to the structure of the NTS surface, it does not shrink since the decrease of the NTS volume would increase its energy.

Introduction
Quantum field theory has been developed to predict the scattering probability of elementary particles. However, in the mid 1970s it was found out that this theory predicts one more class of stable compact objects: non-topological solitons (NTS). The NTS represents an unusual coherent state of matter, called also bulk matter. Models were suggested for the NTS to exist in forms of stars, quasars, the dark matter and nuclear matter.

A NTS configuration is the lowest energy solution of classical equations of motion possessing a spherical symmetry. Such a solution has been found for a rich variety of field Lagrangians. One can associate the conserved charge  with global, local, Abelian and non-Abelian symmetry. It appears to be possible that the NTS configuration exists with both bosons as well as with fermions. In different models either one and the same field carries the charge and binds the NTS, or there are two different fields: charge carrier and binding field.

The spatial size of the NTS configuration may be elementary small or astronomically large, depending on the model fields and constants. The NTS size could increase  with its energy until the gravitation complicates its behavior and finally causes the collapse. In some models, the NTS charge is bounded by the stability (or metastability) condition.

Simple examples

One field
For a complex scalar field with the U(1) invariant Lagrange density

 

the NTS is a ball with radius R filled with the field . The value  is adjusted so that it minimises the energy of the configuration

 

Since the U(1) symmetry gives the conserved current 

the ball possesses the conserved charge

 

The minimization of the energy (1) with R gives

 

The charge conservation allows the decay of the ball into Q particles exactly. This decay is energetically unprofitable if the sum mass Qm exceed the energy (2). Therefore, for the NTS existence it is necessary to have

 

The thin wall approximation, which was used above, allows to omit the gradient term  in the expression for energy (1), since .

Two fields

The NTS configuration for a couple of interacting scalar fields is sketched here.
The Lagrange density

 

It carries the conserved charge . In order to check that the energy of the configuration is smaller than Qm, one should either to calculate this energy numerically or to use the variational method. For trial functions

 

the energy in the large Q limit is approximately equal to
.

The minimization with R gives the upper estimation 

for the energy of the exact solution of motion equations

Fermion plus scalar
If instead of boson, fermions carry the conserved charge, an NTS also exists. At this time one could take

 

N is the number of fermion species in the theory. Q can't exceed N due to the Pauli exclusive principle if the fermions are in the coherent state. This time the NTS energy E is bound by

 

See Friedberg/Lee.

Stability

Classical stability
The condition  only allows to assert the NTS stability against a decay into free particles. The equation of motion gives  only on a classical level.

The condition of stability against the fission looks as follows:

 

It signifies that . This condition is satisfied for the NTS in examples 2.2 and 2.3. The NTS in example 2.1, called also Q-ball, is stable against the fission as well, even though the energy (2) does not satisfy (4): one has to recollect the omitted gradient surface energy and to add it to the Q-ball energy (1). Perturbatively, . Thus

 

Another job  does, is to set   for the thin-wall description of Q-ball: for small Q the surface becomes thicker,  grows and kills the energy gain . However the formalism for the thick-wall approximation has been developed by Kusenko who says that for small Q, NTS also exists.

Quantum correction
As for quantum correction, it also diminishes the binding energy per charge  for small NTS, making them unstable. The small NTS are especially important for the fermion case, since it is naturally to expect rather small number of fermions species N in (3), and consequently, Q. For Q=2 the quantum correction decreases the binding energy by 23%.
For Q=1 a calculation based on the path integral method has been carried out by Baacke.
The quantum energy has been derived as a time derivative of the one-loop fermion effective action

 

This calculation gives the loop energy of the order of binding energy.
In order to find the quantum correction following the canonical method of quantization, one has to solve the Schrödinger equation for the Hamiltonian built with quantum expansion of field functions. For the boson field NTS it reads

 

 

For this calculation the smallness of four-interaction constant is essential, since the Hamiltonian is taken in the lowest order of that constant. The quantum decreasing of the binding energy increases the minimal charge  making the NTS metastable between old and new values of this charge.

NTSs in some models become  unstable as Q exceeds some stable charge . For example, NTS with fermions carrying a gauge charge has  exceeding Qm for Q large enough as well as for small one. Besides, the gauged NTS probably is unstable against a classical decay without conservation of its charge due to complicated vacuum structure of the theory.
Generally, the NTS charge is limited by the gravitational collapse:
.

Particle emission
If one adds to the Q-ball Lagrange density an interaction with massless fermion 

 

which is also U(1) invariant assuming the global charge for boson twice as for fermion, Q-ball once created begins to emit its charge with -pairs, predominantly from its surface. The evaporation rate per unit area .

The ball of trapped right-handed Majorana neutrinos in  symmetric electroweak theory loses its charge (the number of trapped particles) through the neutrino-antineutrino annihilation by emitting photons from the whole volume.

The third example for a NTS metastable due to particle emission is the gauged non-Abelian NTS. The massive (outside the NTS) member of fermionic multiplet decays into a massless one and a gauged boson also massless in the NTS. Then the massless fermion carries away the charge since it does not interact at all with the Higgs field.

Three last examples represent a class for NTS metastable due to emission of particles which do not participate in the NTS construction. One more similar example: because of the Dirac mass term  , right-handed neutrinos convert to left-handed ones. That happens at the surface of neutrino ball mentioned above. Left-handed neutrinos are very heavy inside the ball and they are massless outside it. So they go away carrying the energy and diminishing the number of particles inside. This "leakage" appears to be much slower than the annihilation onto photons.

Soliton-stars

Q-star

A proper name for such an object is a star. A boson-field Q-star looks like a big Q-ball. The way gravity changes E(Q) dependence is sketched here. It is the gravity what makes  for Q-star — stabilize it against the fission.

Q-star with fermions has been described by Bahcall/Selipsky. Similar the NTS of Friedberg & Lee, the fermion field carrying a global conserved charge, interacts with a real scalar field.

 

The  inside Q-star moves from a global maximum of the potential changing the mass of fermions and making them bound.

But this time Q is not the number of different fermion species but it is the large number of one and the same kind particles in the Fermi gas state. Another unknown function is the scalar field  profile which obeys the following motion equation : . Here is the scalar density of fermions, averaged on statistical ensemble:

 

Fermi energy of the fermion gas .

They are constant since we have neglected the derivatives. The fermion pressure

 

That means fermions appear to be massless in the NTS. Then the full fermion energy . For an NTS with the volume  and the charge , its energy is proportional to the charge: .

The described above fermion Q-star has been considered  as a model for neutron star in the effective hadron field theory.

Soliton star
If the scalar field potential  has two degenerate or almost degenerate minima, one of them have to be the real (true) minimum in which we happen to leave. Inside NTS  occupies another one. In such a model non-zero vacuum energy appears only at the NTS surface, not in its volume. This allows for the NTS to be very big without falling in gravitational collapse.

That is the case in the left-right symmetric electroweak theory. For a scale of symmetry breaking about 1 TeV, -ball of trapped right-handed massless neutrino might have the mass (energy) about 108 solar masses and was considered as a possible model for quasar.

For the degenerate potential 
both boson and fermion soliton stars were investigated.

A complex scalar field could alone form the state of gravitational equilibrium possessing the astronomically large conserved number of particles. Such objects are called minisoliton stars because of their microscopic size.

Non-topological soliton with standard fields
Could a system of the Higgs field and some fermion field of the Standard model be in the state of Friedberg & Lee NTS ? The more so if the vacuum energy in the NTS interior  is large, that would mean the large Higgs mass . The large fermion mass implies strong Yukawa coupling .

Calculation shows that the NTS solution is energetically favored over a plane wave (free particle) only if  for even very small . For

The next question is whether or not multi-fermion NTS like a fermion Q-star is stable in the Standard model. If we restrict ourself by one fermion species, then the NTS has god the gauge charge. One can estimate the energy of gauged NTS as follows:

 

Minimization with  gives the NTS energy as a function of its charge:

 

An NTS is stable if  is smaller than the sum of masses for  particles at infinite distance each from other.

Why could not quarks be  bound in a hadron like in NTS. Friedberg and Lee investigated such a possibility. They assumed quarks getting huge masses from their interaction with a scalar field . Thus free quarks are heavy and escape from detection. The NTS built with quarks and   fields demonstrate static properties of hadrons with 15% accuracy. That model demands SU(3) symmetry additional to the color one in order to preserve the later unbroken so that QCD gluons get large masses by SU(3) symmetry breaking outside hadrons and also avoid detection.

Nuclei have been considered as NTS's in the effective theory of strong interaction which is easier to deal with than QCD.

Solitonogenesis

Trapped particles
The way NTS's could be born by depends on whether or not the Universe carries a net charge. If it does not then NTS could be formed from random fluctuations of the charge. Those fluctuations grow up, disturb the vacuum and create  NTS configurations.

If the net charge is present, i.e. charge asymmetry exists with a parameter , NTS could be simply born as the space became divided onto finite regions of true and false vacuum during the phase transition in the early Universe. Those occupied by the NTS (false) vacuum are almost ready NTSs. The scenario of the region formation depends on the phase transition order.

If the first order phase transition occurs, then nucleating bubbles of true vacuum grow and percolate, shrinking regions filled with the false vacuum. The later are preferable for charged particles to live in due to their smaller masses, so those regions become
NTSs.

In case of the second order phase transition  as temperature drops below the crucial value  the space consist of interconnecting regions of both false and true vacua with characteristic size . This interconnection "freezes out" as its rate becomes smaller than the expansion rate of the Universe at Ginzburg temperature , then the regions of two vacua  percolate.

But if the false vacuum energy is large enough,  on the plot, the false vacuum forms finite clusters (NTS's) surrounded by the percolated true vacuum.
The trapped charge stabilizes clusters against collapse.

In the second scenario of the NTS formation the number of born -charged NTS's per unit volume is simply the number density of clusters holding  particles. Their number density is given
The number of particle in a cluster is
, here  is the charge density in the universe at Ginzburg temperature. Thus big clusters are born very rarely and if the minimum stable charge  is present, then overwhelming majority of born NTS carries .

For the following Lagrange density with biased discrete symmetry

 

with

 

  and 

it appears to be   and

Field condensate
The net charge could be also placed in the complex scalar field condensate  instead of free particles. This condensate could consist of spatially homogeneous  and
 provides its potential to be at minimum as the universe cools down and the temperature correction changes the form of the potential. Such a model was treated to explain the baryon asymmetry.

If the field potential allows Q-ball to exist, then they could be born from this condensate as the charge volume density  drops in course of the universe expansion and becomes equal to Q-balls charge density.

Breaking the condensate onto Q-balls appears to be favorable over further dilution of the homogeneous charge density by expansion. The total charge in a comoving volume  stays fixed of course.

The condensation of  could occur at high temperature of the universe, due to the negative temperature correction to its mass:  which provides with minimum its potential . Here the last term is induced by the interaction  with  additional field  that has to be introduced in order to satisfy the Q-ball existence condition . At the temperature relevant to relevant Q-balls formation  appears only through virtual process (loops) because it is heavy. An alternative way to satisfy the Q=ball existence condition is to appeal to the non-Abelian symmetry.

Further evolution
Once formed, the NTSs undergo complicated evolution, losing and acquiring the charge by interaction with each other and surrounding particles. In the first and the second cases, their up-to-date abundance (if any) has nothing to do with that at the moment of formation.

Since an NTS is a composite object, it has to demonstrate properties different from those of a single particle, e.g. evaporation emission, excitation levels, scattering  form-factor. Cosmic observations of such phenomena could provide the unique information about the physics beyond the ability of accelerators.

See also
 Fermi ball
 Topological defect

References

Quantum field theory
Solitons